The London Conference was held in London, in the United Kingdom, in 1866. It was the third and final in a series of conferences that led to Canadian Confederation in 1867. Sixteen delegates from the Province of Canada, Nova Scotia, and New Brunswick gathered to set out the final outline of the proposed Canadian Confederation, resulting in the British North America Act, 1867 (now the Constitution Act, 1867).

Upon the conclusion of the discussions by the delegates, the British government directed that a bill be drafted to implement the resolutions of the Conference.  Introduced in 1867, the British North America Act, 1867 was passed by both Houses of Parliament and then received royal assent from Queen Victoria on March 29, 1867.  It was proclaimed in force on July 1, 1867, creating the Dominion of Canada.

The Conference 

The London Conference began on December 4, 1866. It was a continuation of the Quebec Conference held in 1864, which had produced the Quebec Resolutions.  The conference was held at the Westminster Palace Hotel, just across the street from the British Parliament buildings.  John A. Macdonald was the chairman of the conference.

Delegates
In 1866, the Province of Canada was composed of Canada East (now Quebec), and Canada West (now Ontario).  The Province of Canada sent a total of six delegates, but for the purposes of the Conference, they were treated as two separate delegations.

Canada East
Canada East sent three delegates:  George-Étienne Cartier, Alexander Tilloch Galt, and Hector-Louis Langevin.

Canada West
Canada West sent three delegates:  William Pearce Howland, John A. Macdonald, and William McDougall.

New Brunswick
New Brunswick sent five delegates:  Charles Fisher, John Mercer Johnson, Peter Mitchell, Samuel Leonard Tilley, and Robert Duncan Wilmot.

Nova Scotia
Nova Scotia send five delegates:  Adams George Archibald, William Alexander Henry, Jonathan McCully, John William Ritchie, and Charles Tupper.

Major issues

Inter-colonial railway
One of the major issues when the Conference opened was the proposed Inter-Colonial Railway linking the Province of Canada to the Maritimes.  This issue was quickly resolved when Macdonald stated that the Province of Canada agreed that the obligation to build the railway should be included in the legislation.

Structure of the Senate
The composition of the proposed Senate continued to be a major issue, with a suggestion from the British government that the Senate be elected, not appointed.

Denominational schools 
A major issue of contention was the education system, with Roman Catholic bishops lobbying for guarantees protecting the separate school system. This was opposed by delegates from the Maritimes, and the compromise reached was Section 93 of the act, which guaranteed separate school systems in Quebec and Ontario but not in Nova Scotia or New Brunswick.

See also
 Charlottetown Conference, 1864
 Quebec Conference, 1864
 Anti-Confederation Party

References

Further reading

External links
 Canadian Confederation: The London Conference, December 1866 - March 1867 at Library and Archives Canada

Canadian Confederation
Constitutional conventions (political meeting)
Diplomatic conferences in the United Kingdom
19th-century diplomatic conferences
1866 in international relations
1866 in Canada
Conferences in London
1866 conferences
1866 in London